Climate change is already affecting Japan, and the Japanese government is increasingly enacting policy to respond. However, its climate change policy has been described as "dirty" and the government criticised for lacking a credible plan to get to its pledged net zero greenhouse gas emissions by 2050. As a signatory of the Kyoto Protocol, and host of the 1997 conference which created it, Japan is under treaty obligations to reduce its carbon dioxide emissions and to take other steps related to curbing climate change.

Greenhouse gas emissions

Japan has pledged to become carbon neutral by 2050. In 2019 Japan emitted 1212 Mt CO2eq, The per capita  emissions were 9.31 tonnes in 2017 and was the 5th largest producer of carbon emissions.  greenhouse gas emissions by Japan are over 2% of the annual world total, partly because coal supplies over 30% of its electricity. Coal-fired power stations were still being constructed in 2021 some may become stranded assets.

Calculations in 2021 show that to give the world a 50% chance of avoiding a temperature rise of 2 degrees or more, Japan should increase its climate commitments by 49%. For a 95% chance, it should increase the commitments by 151%. For a 50% chance of staying below 1.5 degrees, Japan should increase its commitments by 229%. A March 2021 analysis by Climate Action Tracker said that Japan should reduce greenhouse gas emissions so that by 2030 the emissions are 60% below 2013 levels; this would support a goal of limiting warming to 1.5 °C.

Impacts on the natural environment

Temperature and weather changes 

Climate change has affected Japan drastically. The temperature and rainfall have increased rapidly in the years leading up to 2020. This has resulted in immature rice grains and also oranges that automatically get separated from their skin due to immature growth by inappropriate weather. Lots of corals in the Japanese seas and oceans have died due to rising sea temperatures and ocean acidification. Tiger mosquitoes who transmit dengue fever were found further north than before.

Earth Simulator calculations reveal the daily increase in mean temperature in Japan during the period 2071 to 2100. The temperature will increased by 3.0 °C in Scenario B1 and 4.2 °C in A1B compared to that of 1971 to 2000. Similarly, the daily maximum temperature in Japan will increase by 3.1 °C in B1 and 4.4 °C in A1B. The precipitation in summer in Japan will increase steadily due to global warming (annual average precipitation will increase by 17% in Scenario B1 and by 19% in Scenario A1B during the period 2071–2100 compared to that of 1971–2000).

Ecosystems
As the climate change is affecting Japan, the ecosystem in Japan is in a major danger. Some of the major impacts from the climate change on the ecosystem are the changes of air and water quality. Although there have not been extreme ecosystem crashes in Japan, it is required for the government to watch out for any kinds of outbreaks in Japan's ecosystem. As the climate change heavily affects the weather patterns in Japan, people in Japan will most likely experience severe weather conditions such as storms, floods, and droughts. According to WWF Climate Change report, it is shown that the habitat of mosquitoes is dramatically increasing in Japan, which could result in an increase of diseases. Hokkaido, northern island in Japan, is the home of hundreds of animals as its northern part is as cold as artic and the southern part of Hokkaido has forests with warmer temperature all year around. In fact, over 20 percent of mammals, fishes, and vascular plants are already facing the reality of extinction due to the climate change. On top of the extinction of mammals, fishes, and plants, reptiles and bird species are facing extinction as well.

References
MOE, 2006. Chapter 5: Vulnerability Assessment, Climate Change Impacts and Adaptation Measures. pp. 191–202 in Japan's Fourth National

Communication Under the United Nations Framework Convention on Climate

Change. Government of Japan

Case, M., &amp; Tidwell, A. (n.d.). Climate impacts threatening Japan today and tomorrow - WWFジャパン. Nippon changes Climate impacts threatening Japan today and tomorrow. Retrieved May 2, 2022, from https://www.wwf.or.jp/activities/lib/pdf_climate/environment/WWF_NipponChanges_lores.pdf

Coral reefs
In January 2017 the Japanese environment ministry said that 70% of the Sekisei lagoon in Okinawa, Japan's biggest coral reef, had been killed by coral bleaching. Coral reefs house many fish, so this had, and will have, terrible consequences.

Mitigation and adaptation

Policies and legislation 
As a member in the Paris Agreement, Japan was the first nation to release a new national climate plan by 2020 as required in the 2015 agreement. However, this new plan included no major changes from the 2013 national climate plan, which aimed to reduce emissions by 26% from 2013 rates. This lack of aggressive action as the fifth largest polluter in the world led the World Resources Institute to describe the plan as "putting the world on a more dangerous trajectory." Similarly, the head of the World Wildlife Fund Japan climate and energy group, Naoyuki Yamagishi, described the plan as "completely the wrong signal."

In 2018, Japan established its Strategic Energy Plan, with goals set for 2030. The plan aimed to reduce coal use from 32 to 26 percent, to increase renewables from 17 to 22–24 percent, and to increase nuclear from 6 to 20–22 percent of the energy production mix. As part of this goal, Japan announced a goal of shutting down 100 old, low-efficiency coal-fired plants out of its 140 coal fired power plants. As of 2020, 114 of Japan's 140 coal-fired plants are deemed old and inefficient. Twenty-six are considered high-efficiency, and 16 new high-efficiency plants are currently under construction. Funding of overseas coal power ended in 2021. The Japanese government said that they would try to be carbon neutral as soon as possible in the second half of the century. The official goal of the Japanese government is to be net zero in 2050.

The Cool Biz campaign introduced under former Prime Minister of Japan Junichiro Koizumi was targeted at reducing energy use through the reduction of air conditioning use in government offices..

At municipality level 
Local governments, both prefectures and municipalities, are responsible for creating their own climate change adaptation plans under the Climate Change Adaptation Act, which came into force in December 2018. They are also tasked with creating Local Climate Change Adaptation Centers to study climate change adaptation, which can be established in partnership with research institutes, universities, or other appropriate local institutions. By 2021, 22 of the 47 prefectures and 30 of the 1,741 municipalities had established plans, while 23 prefectures and 2 municipalities had established research centers. While local governments can create joint plans and centers under the legislation, by 2021 none had done so.

Japan's capital Tokyo is preparing to force industry to make big cuts in greenhouse gases, taking the lead in a country struggling to meet its Kyoto Protocol obligations. Tokyo's outspoken governor, Shintaro Ishihara, decided to go it alone and create Japan's first emissions cap system, reducing greenhouse gas emission by a total of 25% by 2020 from the 2000 level.

International cooperation 
Japan created the Kyoto Protocol Target Achievement Plan to lay out the necessary measures required to meet their 6% reduction commitment under the Kyoto Protocol. It was first established as an outcome of the evaluation of the Climate Change Policy Program carried out in 2004. The main branches of the plan are ensuring the pursuit of environment and economy, promoting of technology, raising public awareness, utilizing of policy measures, and ensuring international collaboration.

See also

Energy in Japan
Cool Earth 50
Environmental issues in Japan
Plug-in electric vehicles in Japan

External links
 Japan Beyond Coal campaign

References

Climate change in Japan
Japan